The Rose is a 2003 Taiwanese drama starring Ella Chen, Jerry Huang, Joe Cheng, Joelle Lu and Cecilia Yip. It was based on the Japanese josei manga, written by Akemi Yoshimura and directed by Chu Yu-ning (瞿友寧). It was broadcast on Taiwan Television (TTV) (台視) from 25 May 2003 to 23 November 2003. The series won Most Popular Drama of the Year at the 2004 Golden Bell Awards, Taiwan.

Synopsis
Zheng Bai He (Ella Chen), after being dumped by her boyfriend because she is ugly and fat and having her grandmother die on the same day (talk about fate), finds that her mother did not die. Furthermore, her mother is the famous actress Han Li (Cecilia Yip). She finds herself in the Han family, yet, the truth about her birth has not been revealed.

Surrounded by three half-siblings, Han Fu Rong (Joelle Lu), Han Jin (Jerry Huang) and Han Kui (Joe Cheng), all by the same mother but different fathers, and a pretty harsh and cold mother, Bai He (Ella Chen) takes on the role of a maid. The three siblings are isolated from each other and the society. They have a cold appearance, yet each of them has a warm story behind them. This is the fairy tale of how Cinderella changes each of them, and finds the princess within herself.

Bai He is an extremely ordinary young girl in the story. Even though she has a kind-hearted and generous heart, but being short and chubby, she is always being refused by people because she is not attractive enough. Her appearance has always been the origin of Bai He's inferior feelings. Because that is a fact that no matter how much strength she uses, she is unable to change. This inferior feeling deeply influences Bai He's life, her interpersonal relations, and even her own emotions. There are lots of beautiful girls that always appears by Bai He's side. The radiance that they give off is like that of a peacock spreading its feathers, conceited and arrogantly striding ahead with their chins up. And Bai He is always used to retreating to the back. In her mind, "I am always ugly." has long ago became an established law that doesn't change. When other people harms her, makes her doubt this established law of hers, she would turn around and make excuses for that person, comforting her own wavering, uneasy heart.

Bai He is exactly this girl that is gentle and soft, yet has inferior feelings of herself. Even though her beautiful heart far surpasses outward appearances by a thousand hundred times, but in a society that has all along judged people by their appearances, she is just like many of the other girls who also has ordinary appearances who deeply feel miserable over their lack in their looks and forgets about the other characteristics and merits that they have. That is, until she finds the confidence and courage to love herself from all those people that loves her. She eventually reveals the brilliant glitter of her gem and helps the people that she loves in her family to untie the knot of many years of disputes, to accept each other once again.

The Rose preserves the established roles of the original story and the story's infrastructure, also strengthens the personality of the roles, making them stand out, detailing the turning points of the character's mood within the show, hoping that within the entertainment, it can give the audience even more moving feelings. Furthermore, guiding the audience through an even deeper layer of thinking on love, family and friendship.

Cast

Main cast

Supporting cast

Soundtrack

Published by HIM International Music on 1 June 2003
 Opening theme song – "花都開好了" (Flowers Have Blossomed) – S.H.E
 Ending theme song – "葉子" (Leaves) – A-Sun

References

External links
  TTV The Rose official homepage
  TTV The Rose Forum

Taiwanese drama television series
Taiwan Television original programming
Taiwanese television dramas based on manga
Taiwanese romance television series
Sanlih E-Television original programming